Salisbury Beach State Reservation is a state-owned, public recreation area on the Atlantic Ocean in the town of Salisbury, Massachusetts, managed by the Massachusetts Department of Conservation and Recreation. It is one of the most heavily utilized state parks in the Commonwealth, with "an annual attendance rate of over one million visitors."

History
During the American Civil War the Fort at Salisbury Point was built on the site, which was eventually lost due to beach erosion. The land was acquired for use as a state park in 1931. It saw improvements in the following decade done by the Works Progress Administration and the Civilian Conservation Corps. During World War II the site included a gun battery as the Salisbury Beach Military Reservation. The reservation came under the jurisdiction of the Department of Conservation and Recreation in 1969. Continuing park improvements include the construction of a new jetty in 2015.

Wildlife
Notable wildlife includes harbor seals, which are often found on Badgers Rocks in the Merrimack River in the fall and winter. Birds that can be sighted include black ducks, green-winged teal, and great blue herons, along with pectoral, solitary, and least sandpipers. "White-winged and surf scoters can be seen flying low over open water or bobbing in loose flocks among the offshore waves."

Activities and amenities
Beaches: The park features a  beach on the Atlantic Ocean. Beaches and restrooms are handicapped-accessible. Smaller, non-swimming beaches are found on the Merrimack River. 
Camping: The park's 484-site campground includes handicapped-accessible sites as well as RV hookups and dump station.  
Boating: Motorized and non-motorized boating can be accessed from two boat ramps on the Merrimack River.
The park also offers showers, picnicking, a playground and pavilion, fishing, restricted hunting, a group day-use area, and educational programs.
Fees: In 2015, the park entrance fee was $14 a day for Massachusetts residents and $16 for visitors from out of state.

References

External links
Salisbury Beach State Reservation Department of Conservation and Recreation

State parks of Massachusetts
Parks in Essex County, Massachusetts
Campgrounds in Massachusetts
Salisbury, Massachusetts
Protected areas established in 1931
1931 establishments in Massachusetts